The Poprad is a river in northern Slovakia and southern Poland, and a tributary of the Dunajec River near Stary Sącz, Poland. It has a length of 170 kilometres (63 km of which are within the Polish borders) and a basin area of 2,077 km2, (1,594 km2 of which is in Slovakia, and 483 km2 in Poland). Much of the Polish part of its basin is included in the protected area called Poprad Landscape Park featuring the Poprad River Gorge, a popular tourist destination between the towns of Piwniczna and Rytro.

Poprad is the only large Slovak river flowing north into southern Poland. The river flows through the Slovak towns of Poprad, Kežmarok, Stará Ľubovňa, then forms for 31.1 km the Polish-Slovak border and flows through the Polish towns of Krynica-Zdrój, Muszyna, Piwniczna-Zdrój, Rytro, Stary Sącz, and Żegiestów, among others.

Etymology
The name is derived from a Proto-Slavic verb pręd- (to flow fast, to jump), preserved in the Slovak words priasť, pradenie (to spin, spinning).

See also
 Rivers of Poland
 Rivers of Slovakia
 Poprad (town), Slovakia

References

Bibliography
 
 Zofia Radwańska-Paryska, Witold Henryk Paryski; Wielka encyklopedia tatrzańska. Poronin: Wydawnictwo Górskie, 2004. .
 Beskid Sądecki. Mapa 1:50 000. Piwniczna: Agencja Wyd. „Wit”. .
 Jerzy Kondracki, Geografia regionalna Polski. Warszawa: Wyd. Naukowe PWN, 1998. 

Spiš
Rivers of Slovakia
Rivers of Poland
Rivers of Lesser Poland Voivodeship
International rivers of Europe